2014 Women's Caribbean Cup. Twenty nations entered the First Round in 5 groups, but three withdrew before playing any match.  The group winners and 2 best runners-up teams joined Trinidad and Tobago in the Second Round, split into 2 groups of 4.  The Second Round group winners and runners-up qualified for the Championship.  The Second Round group winners met for the Women's Caribbean Cup; the Second Round runners-up met for third place.  Though announced as the inaugural edition, the Women's Caribbean Cup had been held once before in 2000. The tournament also served as a qualifier for the 2014 CONCACAF Women's Championship


First round

Group 1
Hosted in Antigua and Barbuda (UTC−4). Matches were played 23–27 May.

Group 2
Hosted in Puerto Rico (UTC−4). Matches were played 23–27 May.

Group 3
Hosted in Turks and Caicos Islands (UTC−4). Matches were played 23–27 May. Bermuda was added to the group after the group stage draw.

Group 4
Hosted in Haiti (UTC−4). Matches were played 30 May – 3 June.

Group 5
Hosted in Dominican Republic (UTC−4). Matches were played 18–22 June.

Ranking of second placed teams
The two runners-up with the best records against the 1st and 3rd placed teams in their respective groups also qualified for the final round.

Final round
Hosted in Trinidad and Tobago (UTC−4). Matches were played 19–26 August. The top two teams of each group qualified for the CONCACAF Women's Championship.

Group A

Group B

Match for third place

Final

Goalscorers
Includes both first round and final round.
14 goals
 Shakira Duncan

7 goals

 Tasha St. Louis
 Phoenetia Browne

6 goals

 Shauntae Todd
 Donna-Kay Henry
 Mariah Shade

4 goals
 Yaqueisi Núñez

3 goals

 Cheyra Bell
 Shenel Gall
 Kensie Bobo
 Wisline Dolce
 Marie Yves Dina Jean Pierre
 Alexa Allen
 Omolyn Davis
 Prisca Carin
 Karina Socarrás
 Kennya Cordner

2 goals

 Betzaida Ubrí
 Samantha Brand
 Manoucheka Pierre Louis
 Kerisha Powell
 Janine François
 Dernelle Mascall
 Kendice Franklyn

1 goal

 Amelia Green
 Kanika Buckley
 Kitanya Hughes
 Breanna Humphreys
 Aaliyah Nolan
 Akeyla Furbert
 Dominique Richardson
 Courtisha Ebanks
 Shanelle Frederick
 Rachel Peláez
 Yoanna Calderón
 Gabriela Peña
 Generve Charles
 Yvrase Gervil
 Kencia Marseille
 Dayanai Baro Mesa
 Lindsay Zullo
 Sashana Campbell
 Kenesha Reid
 Amy Loughran
 Sherona Forrester
 Nicole Campbell-Green
 Jodi-Ann McGregor
 Venicia Reid
 Alicia Wilson
 Kelly Brena
 Aurélie Rouge
 María Aquino
 Scout Benson
 Zahimara Fantauzzi
 Jackie Guerra
 Laura Suárez
 Chelsey Harris
 Caroline Springer
 Lavern Francis
 Maylee Atthin-Johnson
 Jessica Adams

1 own goal

 Keunna Dill (playing against Jamaica)
 Ellaisa Marquis (playing against Jamaica)
 Miosoty García (playing against Bermuda)

Unknown scorers

 : 3 additional goals
 : 1 additional goal

See also
CFU Women's Caribbean Cup
2000 CFU Women's Caribbean Cup

References

CFU Women's Caribbean Cup
Women
Carib